Ilija Tutnjević (born 23 April 1994) is a Serbian football midfielder who plays for Hajduk Kula.

References

External links
 
 Ilija Tutnjević stats at utakmica.rs
 Ilija Tutnjević stats at footballdatabase.eu

1994 births
Living people
People from Vrbas, Serbia
Association football midfielders
Serbian footballers
OFK Beograd players
FK TSC Bačka Topola players
FK Jedinstvo Užice players
FK Cement Beočin players
Serbian SuperLiga players